Chamartín may refer to:
Chamartín, Ávila, a municipality in the province of Ávila, Castile and León.
Chamartín (Madrid), an administrative district.
Estadio Chamartín, a former multi-use stadium in Madrid, Spain.
Madrid Chamartín railway station, the second major railway station in Madrid, Spain.
Chamartín Symphony Orchestra, a symphony orchestra based in Madrid, Spain.